Cymindis leachi is a species of ground beetle in the subfamily Harpalinae. It was described by Reiche in 1868.

References

limbata
Beetles described in 1868